Uwada Dam is a gravity dam on the Tadami River  downstream of Kaneyama in the Fukushima Prefecture of Japan. It was constructed between 1952 and 1954 for the purpose of hydroelectric power generation. It supplies a 63.9 MW power station with water.

See also

Miyashita Dam – located downstream
Honna Dam – located upstream

References

Dams in Fukushima Prefecture
Hydroelectric power stations in Japan
Dams completed in 1954
Dams on the Tadami River
Gravity dams
Energy infrastructure completed in 1954
1954 establishments in Japan